Destruction '11 was a professional wrestling pay-per-view (PPV) event promoted by New Japan Pro-Wrestling (NJPW). The event took place on October 10, 2011, in Tokyo, at Ryōgoku Kokugikan. The event featured eleven matches (including one dark match), three of which were contested for championships. It was the fifth event under the Destruction name.

Storylines
Destruction '11 featured eleven professional wrestling matches that involved different wrestlers from pre-existing scripted feuds and storylines. Wrestlers portrayed villains, heroes, or less distinguishable characters in the scripted events that built tension and culminated in a wrestling match or series of matches.

Event
The event saw two titles change hands; No Remorse Corps (Davey Richards and Rocky Romero) won the IWGP Junior Heavyweight Tag Team Championship for the first time by defeating Apollo 55 (Prince Devitt and Ryusuke Taguchi), while Masato Tanaka captured the IWGP Intercontinental Championship from inaugural champion, MVP. The event featured a surprise appearance by Yoshihiro Takayama, who attacked Togi Makabe after his match with Minoru Suzuki, setting up a match between the two for Wrestle Kingdom VI in Tokyo Dome. In the main event, Hiroshi Tanahashi successfully defended the IWGP Heavyweight Championship against Tetsuya Naito. Post-match, he was attacked by Toru Yano, who stole his title belt, setting up the title match between the two for Power Struggle.

Results

References

External links
The official New Japan Pro-Wrestling website

2011
2011 in professional wrestling
Events in Tokyo
October 2011 events in Japan
Professional wrestling in Tokyo